Md Yusnan Yusof (1 July 1968 — 30 April 2021) was a Malaysian politician from the Malaysian Islamic Party (PAS). He served as the Member of the Kelantan State Legislative Assembly for Melor from 2013 to 2021.

He died on 30 April 2021, leaving his widow, Romaini Mat Daud, and 6 children. Initially, there was a rumour that his death was due to the COVID-19 vaccine, although it was denied by his family. His body was later buried in Ketereh. As the seat was vacated, a by-election was supposed to be held, but was postponed due to the emergency order declared in January in order to curb the COVID-19 pandemic.

Election results

References 

1968 births
2021 deaths
Malaysian people of Malay descent
Malaysian Islamic Party politicians
Members of the Kelantan State Legislative Assembly
People from Kelantan